Negeri Sembilan Football Club, commonly referred to as Negeri Sembilan FC or simply NSFC, is a Malaysian professional football club based in Seremban, Negeri Sembilan, Malaysia.

From 2000 to 2009, Negeri Sembilan played in the Premier 1, Premier 2, Super League and the Premier League. During that period, the team has won the FA Cup in 2003, the Super League in 2006, and the Malaysia Cup in 2009. In addition, the team has also been runners-up in the Malaysia Cup in 2000 and 2006, the Charity Cup in 2004, the Super League in 2008, and the Premier League in 2005. 

This article displays Negeri Sembilan's squads, competitions, transfers, statistics, and achievements for the period 2000–2009.

Events (2000–2009) 

On May 31, 2003, Negeri Sembilan met Perlis in the FA Cup final. Played at Perak Stadium, the club was surprised by the opponent's early goal in the 11th minute. The club managed to close the gap in the 56th minute thanks to a goal by Effendi Malek. The game remained 1-1 until the 90th minute, and in extra time, victory was decided on a golden goal. In the 95th minute, the club managed to get the golden goal as a result of Everson Martinelli's goal, and the club was crowned FA Cup champion in 2003.

In 2004, the capacity of Negeri Sembilan's Tuanku Abdul Rahman Stadium was upgraded to 45,000 people for the hosting of the 2004 Sukma Games. This benefitted Negeri Sembilan fans as the numbers of maximum spectators increased and was best used for the big match such as a derby or a final match.

Negeri Sembilan made its first appearance in the AFC Cup competition in the 2004 season. The club made its debut in the first match against Island FC with a big 6-0 win on February 10, 2004. However, the club had to settle for being 3rd in the group after losing all the group stage matches against Geylang United, East Bengal, and Island FC. All teams played at home and away for a total of six games.

In March 2004, Datuk Seri Mohamad Hasan was appointed as the president of the Negeri Sembilan Football Association (PBNS). It's because he successfully held the position as the 10th Menteri Besar of Negeri Sembilan and replaced Isa Samad, who held that position the previous year. Mohamad Hasan was the first Menteri Besar who had ever been a local football player and then became the president of PBNS. He never represented the first team of Negeri Sembilan but played a lot with clubs in Kuala Lumpur and Selangor. He was banned from football for life after receiving a red card when NS Malays played against NS Indians in 1977. He was active in football in the 1970s.

In the 2006 season, the team won the Malaysia Super League by finishing first out of eight clubs that competed. The newly promoted team from the Malaysian Premier League in the 2005 season managed to become the league champion in their first appearance since the Super League was introduced in 2004.

On November 7, 2009, the team ended their 61-year drought in the Malaysia Cup after posting a convincing 3–1 victory over Kelantan in the final at the National Stadium, Bukit Jalil. The team also won all the matches in the Malaysia Cup tournament, starting from the group stage until the final. That final match was a fantastic night.

The repeat final of 2009 between the club and Kelantan happened again on October 30, 2010. However, this time, the club lost 1–2 to Kelantan despite having taken an early lead through a penalty by Shahurain Abu Samah.

2000 Negeri Sembilan FA season

Squad 
Coach: Mohd Zaki Sheikh Ahmad

Goalkeeper

  21. Hamsani Ahmad  (24 y/o)
  22. Mohd Yazid Yassin (25 y/o)
  Suffian Rahman (22 y/o)

Defender

  5. Khairul Anuar Baharom (26 y/o) (Captain)
  6. Salim Khamis
  9. Ching Hong Aik (27 y/o)
  11. Syaiful Sabtu (19 y/o)
  12. Leong Hong Seng (25 y/o)
  13. Khairun Haled Masrom (23 y/o)
  16. Chow Chee Weng (23 y/o)
  Murugayah Elangoo (23 y/o)

Midfielder

  7. Rajan Koran (19 y/o)
  15. Fairuz Saleh
  18. Mohd Nor Sheikh Ismail
  23. Wong Sai Kong (22 y/o)
  25. Shukor Adan (21 y/o)
  Shahrizam Mohamed (21 y/o)
  Zami Mohd Noor (28 y/o)

Forward

  10. Azmi Mohamed  (29 y/o)
  19. Azman Adnan  (29 y/o)
  20. Efendi Abdul Malek  (22 y/o)
  Gustavo Cerro  (31 y/o)

Source:

Competitions

Premier 1

Malaysia Cup 
Table group D:

1.Negri Sembilan       6  6  0  0  20- 4  18

2.Perak                        6  3  1  2   7- 8  10

3.Johor                        6  1  1  4   7-12   4

4.Kedah                       6  0  2  4   2-12   2

Quarter Final

First Legs

Negri Sembilan 4-1 Kelantan

Second Legs

Kelantan 0-3 Negri Sembilan

Semifinals

First Legs

Selangor 2-1 Perak

Sarawak 1-2 Negri Sembilan

Second Legs [Oct 7]

Perak 3-0 Selangor

Negri Sembilan 2-1 Sarawak

Final [Oct 15, Shah Alam Stadium]

Perak 2-0 Negri Sembilan

FA Cup 
Round 1

Negeri Sembilan bye

Round 2

JKR Kelantan 2-1 Negeri Sembilan

[Hashim Mustafa 78, Rosli Ismail 83; Azman Adnan 54]

Negeri Sembilan 5-1 JKR Kelantan

[Md Shukor Adan 50, 78, Azman Adnan 58, Noor Isham Ismail 62, Effendi Malik 66; Cik Hissamudin Hassan 29]

Statistic 
Note:

 Pld = Played, W = Won, D = Drawn, L = Lost, F = Goals for, A = Goals against, Pts= Points, Pos = Position

Archievement 
Malaysia Cup = Runner-up

Top Scorer =

2001 Negeri Sembilan FA season

Squad 
Coach: Mohd Zaki Sheikh Ahmad

Goalkeeper

  21. Hamsani Ahmad (25 y/o)
  22. Yazid Yassin (26 y/o)
  Suffian Rahman (23 y/o)

Defender

  5. Khairul Anuar Baharom (27 y/o)
  12. Leong Hong Seng (26 y/o)
  16. Chow Chee Weng (24 y/o)
  Murugan Elangoo (24 y/o)
  Norhafiz Zamani Misbah (20 y/o)
  Ching Hong Aik (28 y/o)

Midfielder

  7. Rajan Koran (20 y/o)
  11. Syaiful Sabtu (20 y/o)
  20. Efendi Abdul Malek (23 y/o)
  23. Wong Sai Kong (23 y/o)
  25. Shukor Adan (22 y/o)
  Shahrizam Mohamed (22 y/o)
  Nazzab Hidzan (26 y/o)

Forward

  19. Azman Adnan (30 y/o)
  Zami Mohd Noor (29 y/o)

Source:

Competition

Premier 1

Malaysia Cup 
Group Stage

Group A

Knockout Stage

FA Cup 
Round 1

N Sembilan 1-0 Kelantan TNB

[Azrine Effendy 59]

Kelantan TNB 2-2 N Sembilan

[Azman Adnan 39, Zami Md Nor 80; Nordin Shukri 84, Shahruddin Mohamed 88]

Round 2

Perak Lintau 0-3 N Sembilan

[Yusafizan Johar 3, 44, Azman Adnan 72]

N Sembilan 1-0 Perak Lintau

[Khairul Anuar Baharom 90]

Quarter-final

Kelantan JKR 2-1 N Sembilan

[Rosairol Asrol Md.Noor 23, Adnan Md.Zin 53; K Rajan 6]

N Sembilan 1-1 Kelantan JKR

[Zool Ihsan Yunus 16; Md Shukor Adan 24]

Source:

Statistic 
Note:

 Pld = Played, W = Won, D = Drawn, L = Lost, F = Goals for, A = Goals against, Pts= Points, Pos = Position

Archievement 
Top Scorer :

2002 Negeri Sembilan FA season

Squad 
Coach: Mohd Zaki Sheikh Ahmad

Goalkeeper

  Suffian Rahman (23 y/o)
  Mohd Hamsani Ahmad (26 y/o)

Defender

  5. Khairul Anuar Baharom (28 y/o)
  12. Leong Hong Seng (27 y/o)
  Norhafiz Zamani Misbah (21 y/o)
  Mohd Rahman Zabul (20 y/o)

Midfielder

  7. Rajan Koran (21 y/o)
  11. Syaiful Sabtu (21 y/o)
  20. Efendi Abdul Malek (24 y/o)
  Khairil Zainal (28 y/o)
  Shahrizam Mohamed (23 y/o)

Forward

  Azmi Mohamed (31 y/o)
  Zami Mohd Noor (30 y/o)
  Azrine Effendy Sa'duddin (21 y/o)

Source:

Competition

Premier 1

FA Cup 
Round 1

Negeri Sembilan 1-0  Armed Forces

[Azrine Efendy 57]

Armed Forces 1-0  Negeri Sembilan [agg 1-1; aet; Negeri Sembilan 6-5 pens]

[Ahmad Nizam Ariffin 85pen]

Round 2

Pahang 3-2 Negeri Sembilan

[Azmani Kadir 5, Shahruddin Rosdi 32, Jalaluddin Jaafar 71 ; Effendi Malek 9, 63]

Negeri Sembilan 3-1 Pahang [agg 5–4; aet]

[Azmi Mohamed 59, Norhafiz Zamani Misbah 75, Zami Mohd Noor 92 - Juzaili Samion 22]

Quarter-final

Negeri Sembilan 0-3 Penang

[Norhafiz Zamani Misbah 48(OG), Chee Wan Hoe 61, Anuar Abu Bakar 84]

Penang 3-0 Negeri Sembilan [agg 6-0]

[Gustavo Romero 6, Zool Ihsan Yunus 15, S.Sutesh 90]

Source:

Statistic 
Note:

 Pld = Played, W = Won, D = Drawn, L = Lost, F = Goals for, A = Goals against, Pts= Points, Pos = Position

Archievement 
Top Scorer :

2003 Negeri Sembilan FA season

Squad 
Coach: K. Devan

Goalkeeper

  1. Azlisham Ibrahim (30 y/o)
  22. Suffian Rahman (24 y/o)

Defender

  5. Khairul Anuar Baharom  (29 y/o)
  7. B. Rajinikandh (29 y/o)
  12. Lim Chan Yew  (25 y/o)
  13. Anuar Jusoh (31 y/o)
  24. Norhafiz Zamani Misbah  (21 y/o)
  Yosri Derma Raju  (21 y/o)
  Redzuan Mohd Radzy (22 y/o)
  Mohd Rahman Zabul (21 y/o)
  Ching Hong Aik (30 y/o)

Midfielder

  10. Luciano Osmar (25 y/o)
  11. Syaiful Sabtu (22 y/o)
  17. Shahrizam Mohamed (24 y/o)
  25. Rajan Koran (22 y/o)
  Mohd Aiman Wong
  Suharmin Yusuf

Forward

  2. Everson Martinelli (25 y/o)
  19. Azman Adnan (31 y/o)
  20. Efendi Abdul Malek (25 y/o)
  Azrul Amri Burhan (28 y/o)
  Azrine Effendy Sa'duddin (22 y/o)

Source:

Competition

Premier 2 

League Table:

1.Public Bank  - 53 PTS (2003 Liga Perdana 2 Champions)

2.Negeri Sembilan  - 42 PTS (Promotion Play-Off) (Stay in the league)

3.Johor  - 40 PTS (Promotion Play-Off) (Stay in the league)

4.MPPJ FC  - 39 PTS (Promotion Play-Off) (Stay in the league)

5.Brunei  - 39 PTS

6.Kuala Lumpur  - 31 PTS

7.Kelantan SKMK  - 31 PTS

8.PDRM  - 28 PTS

9.Kelantan TNB  - 24 PTS

10.ATM  - 19 PTS

11.Kelantan JPS  - 18 PTS

12.Perak TKN  - 5 PTS

Malaysia Cup 
Group Stage

Standings                  P   W   D   L   F   A   Pts

1.Perlis                      6   4   2   0  14   6   14 Qualified

2.Sarawak                 6   2   3   1  12   8    9 Qualified

3.Melaka Telekom   6   1   2   3   6   8    5

4.Negeri Sembilan   6   1   1   4   5  15    4

FA Cup 
Round 2

First Legs [Mar 12]

Negeri Sembilan 1-1  Pahang

[Azrine Efendy Sa'duddin 86 - Azizol Kamaluddin 36]

Second Legs [Mar 19]

Pahang 1-3  Negeri Sembilan [agg: 2-4]

[Hairuddin Omar 80 - Efendi Malik 15, Luciano Osmar 55, Azman Adnan 65]

Quarter-final

First Legs [Apr 12]

Negeri Sembilan 2-0  Perak

[Everson Martinelli 14, Luciano Osmar 63]

Second Legs [Apr 19]

Perak 1-0  Negeri Sembilan [agg: 1-2]

[Chan Wing Hoong 84]

Semi-final

First Legs [May 10]

Negeri Sembilan 1-0  Sabah

[Efendi Malek 35]

Second Legs [May 17]

Sabah awd Negeri Sembilan [awarded 0–3, agg: 0-4]

[Luciano Gonzalez 74]

[match abandoned at 0-1 after 82 minutes as crowds invaded the pitch]

Final [May 31, Stadium Perak, Ipoh]

Negeri Sembilan 2-1 Perlis  [aet; on golden goal]

[Efendi Malik 56, Everson Martinelli 95 - Phillimon Chipeta 11]

Source:

Statistic 
Note:

 Pld = Played, W = Won, D = Drawn, L = Lost, F = Goals for, A = Goals against, Pts= Points, Pos = Position

Archievement 
Premier 2 : Runner-up

FA Cup : Winner

Top Scorer :

2004 Negeri Sembilan FA season

Squad 
Coach: K. Devan

Goalkeeper

  21. Azizon Abdul Kadir (24 y/o)
  Cajetan Ndubuisi Oparaugo
  Suffian Rahman (25 y/o)

Defender

  5. Khairul Anuar Baharom (30 y/o)
  7. B. Rajinikandh (30 y/o)
  15. Ching Hong Aik (31 y/o)
  Yosri Derma Raju (22 y/o)
  Norhafiz Zamani Misbah (22 y/o)
  Mohd Rahman Zabul (22 y/o)
  K. Sathian (22 y/o)
  P. Sivanathan

Midfielder

  11. Syaiful Sabtu (23 y/o)
  13. Anuar Jusoh (32 y/o)
  16. Rajan Koran (22 y/o)
  17. Shahrizam Mohamed (25 y/o)
  Syamsol Sabtu (19 y/o)
  Efendi Abdul Malek (26 y/o)
  Shahrin Abdul Majid (35 y/o)
  Suharmin Yusuf

Forward

  29. Alfred Effiong (20 y/o)
  Christian Bekamenga (18 y/o)
  Abdulrazak Ekpoki (22 y/o)
  Mohd Farid Ideris (22 y/o)
  Azrul Amri Burhan (29 y/o)
  Mohd Fairuz Ezwan
  Azrine Effendy Sa'duddin (23 y/o)

Source:

Competition

Premier League 
Group B

Malaysia Cup 
Group B

Knockout Stage

FA Cup 

Second Round

Third Round

Quarter-final

Source:

AFC Cup 
Qualification

Group stageGroup E

Statistic 
Note:

 Pld = Played, W = Won, D = Drawn, L = Lost, F = Goals for, A = Goals against, Pts= Points, Pos = Position

Archievement 
AFC Cup: Group stage

Top scorer:  Shahrin Abdul Majid (11 goals)

2005 Negeri Sembilan Naza season

Squad 
Coach: K. Devan

Goalkeeper

  21. Azizon Abdul Kadir (25 y/o)
  Suffian Rahman (26 y/o)

Defender

  5. Khairul Anuar Baharom (31 y/o)
  7. B. Rajinikandh (31 y/o)
  13. Anuar Jusoh (33 y/o)
  15. Ching Hong Aik (32 y/o)
  25. P. Sivanathan
  Yosri Derma Raju (23 y/o)
  Syamsol Sabtu (20 y/o)
  Aidil Zafuan (18 y/o)
  Mohd Rahman Zabul (23 y/o)
  K. Sathian (23 y/o)

Midfielder

  6. Lateef Seriki (26 y/o)
  8. Idris Abdul Karim (29 y/o)
  16. Rajan Koran (23 y/o)
  17. Shahrizam Mohamed (26 y/o)
  23. Rezal Zambery Yahya (27 y/o)
  K. Thanaraj (19 y/o)
  Khaidir Mohd Dom

Forward

  10. Christian Bekamenga (19 y/o)
  11. Che Hishamuddin Hassan (30 y/o)
  Zaquan Adha (18 y/o)
  Mohd Nizaruddin Yusof (26 y/o)
  Anicet Eyenga (19 y/o)
  Azrine Effendy Sa'duddin (24 y/o)

Source:

Competition

Premier League 
Group B

Final

Malaysia Cup 
Group B

FA Cup 
First round

Statistic 
Note:

 Pld = Played, W = Won, D = Drawn, L = Lost, F = Goals for, A = Goals against, Pts= Points, Pos = Position

Archievement 
Premier League: Winner

Top Scorer:  Christian Bekamenga (16 goals)

2006 Negeri Sembilan Naza season

Squad 
Coach: K. Devan

Goalkeeper

  21. Azizon Abdul Kadir (26 y/o)

Defender

  3. Jason Williams (26 y/o)
  5. Khairul Anuar Baharom (32 y/o)
  6. Bakhtiar Othman (31 y/o)
  7. Aidil Zafuan (19 y/o)
  15. Ching Hong Aik (33 y/o)
  25. P. Sivanathan
  Mohd Nidzam Jamil (26 y/o)
  Syamsol Sabtu (21 y/o)
  Mohd Rahman Zabul (24 y/o)
  K. Sathian (24 y/o)

Midfielder

  8. Idris Abdul Karim (30 y/o)
  13. Anuar Jusoh (34 y/o)
 17. Shahrizam Mohamed (27 y/o)
  18. Noel Rodwell Mwandila (24 y/o)
  23. Rezal Zambery Yahya (28 y/o)
 Shahurain Abu Samah (20 y/o)
 S. Kunanlan (20 y/o)
 Liew Kit Kong (27 y/o)
 K. Thanaraj (20 y/o)
 Norshahrul Idlan (20 y/o)

Forward

  Christian Bekamenga 10. (20 y/o)
  11. Che Hisamuddin Hassan (31 y/o)
  19. Buston Nagbe Browne (21 y/o)
  Shandel Samuel (24 y/o)
  Mohd Nizaruddin Yusof (27 y/o)
  Zaquan Adha (19 y/o)
  Azrine Effendy Sa'duddin (25 y/o)

Source:

Competition

Super League 
League table

Malaysia Cup 
Group A

Knockout Stage

FA Cup 
First round

Second round

Quarter-final 

1st leg2nd lehSemi-final

1st leg2nd leg

Statistic 
Note:

 Pld = Played, W = Won, D = Drawn, L = Lost, F = Goals for, A = Goals against, Pts= Points, Pos = Position

Archievement 
Super League: Winner

Malaysia Cup: Runner-up

Top scorer:  Christian Bekamenga (8 goals)

2007 Negeri Sembilan Naza season

Squad 
Coach:  Hatem Souissi

Goalkeeper

  1. Yazid Yassin (32 y/o)
  21. Azizon Abdul Kadir (27 y/o)
  30. Farizal Harun (21 y/o)

Defender

  2. Mohd Rahman Zabul (25 y/o)
  3. Jason Williams (26 y/o)
  4. Mohd Affandy Adimel (21 y/o)
  5. Khairul Anuar Baharom (33 y/o)
  5. Marián Juhás (28 y/o)
  6. Mohd Nidzam Jamil (27 y/o)
  7. Aidil Zafuan (20 y/o)
  11. Syamsol Sabtu (22 y/o)
  12. Abdullah Sani Yusof
  15. Ching Hong Aik (34 y/o)
  24. Tengku Qayyum (21 y/o)
  29. Qhairul Anwar Roslani (20 y/o)
Midfielder

  6. S. Kunanlan (21 y/o)
  8. Idris Abdul Karim (31 y/o)
  9. Shahurain Abu Samah (21 y/o)
  13. Mohd Anuar Jusoh (35 y/o)
  17. Shahrizam Mohamed (28 y/o)
  20. Norshahrul Idlan Talaha (21 y/o)
  23. Rezal Zambery Yahya (29 y/o)
  25. K. Thanaraj (21 y/o)
  26. Abdul Halim Zainal (19 y/o)
  Muhd Arif Ismail (21 y/o)
  Efendi Abdul Malek (29 y/o)
  Pascal Heije (28 y/o)
  Julius Ejueyitsi (23 y/o)
  Raul Daniel Cojan

Forward

  10. Liew Kit Kong (28 y/o)
  14. Zaquan Adha (20 y/o)
  16. Mohd Hafiz Syobri (28 y/o)
  18. Freddy (28 y/o)
  Buston Nagbe Browne (22 y/o)
  Vítězslav Mooc (29 y/o)
  Eric Muranda (25 y/o)

Source:

Competition

Super League 

League table
The final league table after the final matches of the season on 4 August 2007.

Malaysia Cup 
Group B

Knockout stage

FA Cup 
First round

Second round

AFC Cup 

Qualification

Group Stage

Group D

Statistic 
Note:

 Pld = Played, W = Won, D = Drawn, L = Lost, F = Goals for, A = Goals against, Pts= Points, Pos = Position

Archievement 
AFC Cup: Group stage

Top scorer:  Freddy (18 goals)

2008 Negeri Sembilan Naza season

Squad 
Coach: Wan Jamak Wan Hassan

Goalkeeper

  1. Yazid Yassin (33 y/o)
  Farizal Harun (22 y/o)

Defender

  2. Mohd Rahman Zabul (26 y/o)
  3. Jason Williams (28 y/o)
  5. Marián Juhás (29 y/o)
  7. Aidil Zafuan (21 y/o)
  11. Syamsol Sabtu (23 y/o)
  15. Ching Hong Aik (35 y/o)
  Qhairul Anwar Roslani (21 y/o)
  Tengku Qayyum Tengku Ahmad (22 y/o)

Midfielder

  6. S. Kunanlan (22 y/o)
  9. Shahurain (22 y/o)
  17. Idris Abdul Karim (32 y/o)
  20. Abdul Halim Zainal (20 y/o)
  23. Rezal Zambery Yahya (30 y/o)
  Lamin Conteh (32 y/o)
  K. Thanaraj (22 y/o)
  Efendi Abdul Malek (30 y/o)
  Muhd Arif Ismail (22 y/o)
  Mohd Shaffik Abdul Rahman (24 y/o)

Forward

  8. Zaquan Adha (21 y/o)
  Udo Fortune (20 y/o)

Source:

Competition

Super League 

League table

Malaysia Cup 
Group stage

Group A

FA Cup 
First round

Second round

Source:

Statistic 
Note:

 Pld = Played, W = Won, D = Drawn, L = Lost, F = Goals for, A = Goals against, Pts= Points, Pos = Position

Archievement 
Malaysia Super League: Runner-up

Top scorer: Zaquan Adha (14 goals)

2009 Negeri Sembilan FA season

Squad 
Coach: Wan Jamak Wan Hassan

Goalkeeper

  21. Sani Anuar Kamsani (26 y/o)
  22. Farizal Harun (23 y/o)
  Khairul Ketuhar

Defender

  2. Mohd Rahman Zabul (27 y/o)
  3. Khairul Azwan
  4. Affandy Adimel (23 y/o)
  5. Muhd Arif Ismail (23 y/o)
  7. Aidil Zafuan (22 y/o)
  11. Syamsol Sabtu (24 y/o)
  15. Ching Hong Aik (36 y/o)
  18. Arulchelvan Illenggo (23 y/o)
  24. Mohd Syukri Ismail (23 y/o)
  25. Tengku Qayyum (23 y/o)
  29. Alif Samsudin (20 y/o)
  30. P. Kesavan (23 y/o)
  Qhairul Anwar Roslani (22 y/o)

Midfielder

  6. S. Kunanlan (23 y/o)
  9. Shahurain Abu Samah (23 y/o)
  12. Shukor Adan (30 y/o)
  14. K. Thanaraj (23 y/o)
  17. Idris Abdul Karim (33 y/o)
  19. Muhd Afify Khusli
  20. Abdul Halim Zainal (21 y/o)
  23. Rezal Zambery Yahya (31 y/o)
  28. Asyraf Al-Japri (19 y/o)
  31. V. Parameswaran (22 y/o)
  Efendi Abdul Malek (31 y/o)
  Mohd Shaffik Abdul Rahman (25 y/o)

Forward

  8. Zaquan Adha (22 y/o)
  10. K. Ravindran (20 y/o)
  13. Mohd Faiz Mohd Isa (23 y/o)
  26. Firdaus Azizul (21 y/o)
  27. Hairuddin Omar (30 y/o)

Source:

Competition

Super League 
League table

Malaysia Cup 
Group B

Knockout stageFinal

FA Cup 
First round

Second round

Quarter-final

1st leg

2nd leg

Semi-final

1st leg

2nd leg

Source:

Statistic 
Note:

 Pld = Played, W = Won, D = Drawn, L = Lost, F = Goals for, A = Goals against, Pts= Points, Pos = Position

Archievement 
Malaysia Cup: Winner 

Top scorer : Zaquan Adha (22 goals)

References 

Negeri Sembilan FA
Negeri Sembilan FA seasons
2000 in Malaysian football
2001 in Malaysian football
2002 in Malaysian football
2003 in Malaysian football
2004 in Malaysian football
2005 in Malaysian football
2006 in Malaysian football
2007 in Malaysian football
2008 in Malaysian football
2009 in Malaysian football
Negeri Sembilan
Malaysian football club seasons